Electric Trim is the twelfth studio album by American musician Lee Ranaldo, the former Sonic Youth guitarist, released on September 15, 2017, on Mute Records, marking his first solo album to be released on the label. The album was produced by Ranaldo along with Spanish musician Raül Refree. The album features several musicians, including Sharon Van Etten, Steve Shelley, Alan Licht, and Nels Cline.

Reception
The album has been met with positive reviews from music critics. On Metacritic, which assigns a normalised rating out of 100 to reviews from mainstream publications, it received an average score of 73, based on 13 reviews.

Track listing 

Japanese bonus track

Personnel 
 Lee Ranaldo  – vocals, acoustic guitars, electric guitars, keyboards, electronics, drums, marimba, record producer, mixing

Additional members
Raül Refree – productions, mixing, acoustic guitars, electric guitars, keyboards, electronics, drums, bass guitars, backing vocals
 Sharon Van Etten – additional vocals on "Last Looks"
 Mar Girona – backing vocals
 Alan Licht – electric guitars
 Nels Cline – electric guitars
 Xavi de la Salud – trumpets, flugelhorn
 Tim Luntzel – bajo quinto
 Kid Millions – drums, percussions
 Steve Shelley – drums, percussions
 Cody Ranaldo – electronics
 Greg Calbi – mastering at Sterling Sound, New York City in January 2017

References 

2017 albums
Lee Ranaldo albums
Mute Records albums